Jalangi Assembly constituency is an assembly constituency in Murshidabad district in the Indian state of West Bengal.

Overview
As per orders of the Delimitation Commission, No. 76 Jalangi Assembly constituency covers Jalangi community development block, and Katlamari I, Katlamari II, Rajapur and Raninagar II gram panchayats of Raninagar II community development block.

Jalangi Assembly constituency is part of No. 11 Murshidabad (Lok Sabha constituency).

Members of Legislative Assembly

Election results

2021
In the 2021 election, Abdur Razzak of Trinamool Congress defeated his nearest rival Saiful Islam Molla of CPI (M).

2016
In the 2016 election, Abdur Razzak of CPI(M) defeated his nearest rival Alok Das of Trinamool Congress.

2011
In the 2011 election, Abdur Razzak of CPI(M) defeated his nearest rival Idris Ali of Trinamool Congress.

Samsuzzoha Biswas, contesting as an independent candidate, was a rebel Congress candidate supported by the Baharampur MP, Adhir Chowdhury.

.# Swing calculated on Congress+Trinamool Congress vote percentages taken together in 2006

1977–2006
In the 2006, 2001, 1996 and 1991 state assembly elections Unus Ali Sarkar of CPI(M) won the Jalangi assembly seat defeating his nearest rivals Subrata Saha of Congress in 2006 and 2001, Samsuzzoha Biswas of Congress in 1996, and Ranjit Haldar of Congress in 1991. Contests in most years were multi cornered but only winners and runners are being mentioned. Atahar Rahman of CPI(M) defeated Abdul Bari Biswas of Congress in 1987, Azizur Rahman of ICS in 1982, and Ranjit Kumar Haldar, Independent in 1977.

1951–1972
Prafulla Kumar Sarkar of Bharatiya Jana Sangh won in 1972 and 1971. Azizur Rahman of Congress won in 1969 and 1967. Abdul Bari Moktar, Independent, won in 1962. Golam Soleman of Congress won in 1957. In independent India's first election in 1951, A.M.A.Zaman of Congress won the Jalangi seat.

References

Assembly constituencies of West Bengal
Politics of Murshidabad district